Kalupahana Liyanage Devan Vishvaka (born 17 October 2000) is a New Zealand cricketer, who is a right-handed batsman. He plays for the Wellington Firebirds in domestic cricket. He made his first-class debut for Wellington, on 20 March 2022, against Otago in the 2021–22 Plunket Shield season. He made his Twenty20 debut for the Wellington Firebirds, on 4 January 2023, against the Northern Brave in the 2022–23 Men's Super Smash.

References

External links 
 
 

2000 births
Living people
New Zealand cricketers
Wellington cricketers